Efloxate is a vasodilator.

References 

Vasodilators
Chromones
Phenol ethers
Ethyl esters
Acetate esters